George Mason (died 1562) was a Canon of Windsor from 1560 to 1562.

Career
He was appointed:
Rector of St Mary, Matfellon, Whitechapel 1553–1555
Rector of Bradwell-juxta-Mare, Essex
Rector of St Mary Abchurch 1555–1556
Vicar of St Mary's Church, Luton 1558–1562
Chaplain of the Queen's Chapel Royal
 
He was appointed to the twelfth stall in St George's Chapel, Windsor Castle in 1560, and held the stall until 1562.

Notes 

1562 deaths
Canons of Windsor
Year of birth missing